The Chronic is the debut studio album by the American hip hop producer and rapper Dr. Dre. It was released on December 15, 1992, by his record label Death Row Records and distributed by Interscope Records. Recording sessions took place in June 1992 at Death Row Studios in Los Angeles and at Bernie Grundman Mastering in Hollywood. 

The Chronic was Dr. Dre's first solo album after he departed the hip hop group N.W.A and its label Ruthless Records over a financial dispute. It includes insults towards Ruthless and its owner, the former N.W.A member Eazy-E. It features many appearances by then-emerging American rapper Snoop Dogg, who used the album as a launch pad for his own solo career. The title derives from a slang term for high-grade cannabis, and its cover is an homage to Zig-Zag rolling papers.

The Chronic reached number three on the Billboard 200 and has been certified triple platinum with sales of three million copies in the United States, making Dre one of the top ten best-selling American performing artists of 1993. The Chronic spent eight months in the Billboard Top 10. The album's three singles became top ten Billboard singles. "Nuthin' but a ‘G’ Thang" reached number two on the Billboard Hot 100 and number one on the Hot Rap Singles and Hot R&B Singles charts.

Dr. Dre's production popularized the G-funk subgenre within gangsta rap. The Chronic has been widely regarded as one of the most important and influential albums of the 1990s and one of the best-produced hip hop albums. In 2019, the album was selected by the Library of Congress for preservation in the National Recording Registry as "culturally, historically, or aesthetically significant".

Music

Production 
The production on The Chronic was seen as innovative and ground-breaking, and received universal acclaim from critics. AllMusic commented on Dr. Dre's efforts, "Here, Dre established his patented G-funk sound: fat, blunted Parliament-Funkadelic beats, soulful backing vocals, and live instruments in the rolling basslines and whiny synths" and that "For the next four years, it was virtually impossible to hear mainstream hip-hop that wasn't affected in some way by Dre and his patented G-funk." Unlike other hip hop acts (such as The Bomb Squad) that sampled heavily, Dr. Dre only utilized one or few samples per song. In Rolling Stones The Immortals – The Greatest Artists of All Time, where Dr. Dre was listed at number 56, Kanye West wrote on the album's production quality: "The Chronic is still the hip-hop equivalent to Stevie Wonder's Songs in the Key of Life. It's the benchmark you measure your album against if you're serious."

Jon Pareles of The New York Times described the production, writing "The bottom register is swampy synthesizer bass lines that openly emulate Parliament-Funkadelic; the upper end is often a lone keyboard line, whistling or blipping incessantly. In between are wide-open spaces that hold just a rhythm guitar, sparse keyboard chords." Pareles observed that the songs "were smoother and simpler than East Coast rap, and [Dr. Dre and Snoop Dogg] decisively expanded the hip-hop audience into the suburbs." Until this point, mainstream hip hop had been primarily party music (for example, Beastie Boys) or pro-empowerment and politically charged (for example, Public Enemy or X-Clan), and had consisted almost entirely of samples and breakbeats.Andy Kellman. [ X Clan Biography]. Allmusic. Accessed April 6, 2008. Dr. Dre ushered in a new musical style and lyrics for hip hop. The beats were slower and mellower, samples from late 1970s and early 1980s funk music. By mixing these early influences with original live instrumentation, a distinctive genre known as G-funk was created.

 Lyrics 

The album's lyrics caused some controversy, as the subject matter included sexism and violent representations. It was noted that the album was a "frightening amalgam of inner-city street gangs that includes misogynist sexual politics and violent revenge scenarios".
Most of  the N.W.A members were addressed on the album; Eazy-E and Ice Cube were dissed on the second single "Fuck Wit Dre Day", while MC Ren however was shouted out on the album's intro. Dr. Dre's dissing of former bandmate, Eazy-E, resulted in vicious lyrics, which were mainly aimed at offending his enemy with homosexual implications, although it was noted to have "a spirited cleverness in the phrasing and rhymes; in other words, the song is offensive, but it's creatively offensive".

Snoop Dogg, who had a significant role on the album, was praised for his lyrics and flow, and it was mentioned that "Coupled with his inventive rhymes, Snoop's distinctive style made him a superstar before he'd even released a recording of his own" and that his involvement was as important to the album's success as its production. Touré of The New York Times remarks that "While Snoop delivers rhymes delicately, the content is anything but. Growing up poor, often surrounded by violence, and having served six months in the Wayside County jail outside of Los Angeles (for cocaine possession) gave Snoop Dogg experiences upon which he draws." Snoop Dogg later commented on the "reality" of his lyrics, stating "My raps are incidents where either I saw it happen to one of my close homies or I know about it from just being in the ghetto. I can't rap about something I don't know. You'll never hear me rapping about no bachelor's degree. It's only what I know and that's that street life. It's all everyday life, reality."

 Singles 
Three singles were released from the album: "Nuthin' but a 'G' Thang", "Fuck wit Dre Day" and "Let Me Ride".

"Nuthin' but a 'G' Thang" was released as the first single on November 19, 1992. It peaked at number two on the Billboard Hot 100 and number one on the Hot R&B/Hip-Hop Singles & Tracks and Hot Rap Singles. It sold over a million copies and the Recording Industry Association of America (RIAA) certified it Platinum on March 24, 1993. The song was nominated for Best Rap Performance by a Duo or Group at the 1994 Grammy Awards, but lost to Digable Planets' "Rebirth of Slick (Cool Like Dat)". Steve Huey of AllMusic named it "the archetypal G-funk single" and added "The sound, style, and performances of "Nuthin' but a 'G' Thang" were like nothing else on the early-'90s hip-hop scene." He praised Snoop Dogg's performance, stating "[Snoop Dogg's] flow was laconic and relaxed, massively confident and capable of rapid-fire tongue-twisters, but coolly laid-back and almost effortless at the same time". Today it is one of the most critically and commercially lauded hip-hop/rap songs of all time. It is  rated the 134th best song of all time by Acclaimedmusic.net, and the sixth best hip-hop/rap song, and voted in a VH1 poll as the 13th best song of the 1990s.

"Fuck wit Dre Day (and Everybody's Celebratin')" was released as the second single on May 20, 1993, and like the previous single, it was a hit on multiple charts. It reached number eight on the Billboard Hot 100 and number six on the Hot R&B/Hip-Hop Singles & Tracks. It sold over 500,000 units and the RIAA certified it Gold on October 8, 1993. Allmusic writer Steve Huey stated that the song was "a classic hip-hop single", citing Dr. Dre's production as "impeccable as ever, uniting his signature whiny synth melodies with a halting, descending bass line, a booming snare, and soulful female vocals in the background" and alluded to Snoop Dogg, stating "Attitude was something Snoop had by the boatload, his drawling, laid-back delivery projecting unassailable control – it sounded lazy even though it wasn't, and that helped establish Snoop's don't-give-a-damn persona." The track contains direct insults to rappers East coast rapper Tim Dog, 2 Live Crew member Luke, and Dre's former accomplices Eazy-E & Ice Cube.

"Let Me Ride" was released as a cassette single on September 13, 1993. It experienced moderate success on the charts, reaching number 34 on the Billboard Hot 100 and number three on the Hot Rap Singles. The song won Dr. Dre Best Rap Solo Performance at the 1994 Grammy Awards. On this song and "Nuthin but a "G" Thang", Time magazine noted that Dr. Dre's verses were delivered with a "hypnotically intimidating ease" and made the songs feel like "dusk on a wide-open L.A. boulevard, full of possibility and menace".

 Critical reception 

In a contemporary review for Rolling Stone, Havelock Nelson wrote that the album "drops raw realism and pays tribute to hip-hop virtuosity." Entertainment Weekly said that it "storms with rage, strolls with confidence, and reverberates with a social realism that's often ugly and horrifying". Matty C of The Source claimed that Snoop Dogg's "Slick Rick-esque style" produces "new ground for West Coast MCs" and that the album is "an innovative and progressive hip-hop package that must not be missed." Edna Gundersen of USA Today found "Dre's prowess as beat-master and street preacher" to be "undeniable". Jonathan Gold of the Los Angeles Times wrote that, although the rappers lack "quick wit" and "rhythmic virtuosity", Dre's artistry is "on a par with Phil Spector's or Brian Wilson's." Gold argued that, because Dre recreates rather than samples beats and instrumental work, the finished album's fidelity is not inflected by that of "scratchy R&B records that have been played a million times", unlike productions from East Coast hip hop.

Greg Kot was less enthusiastic in the Chicago Tribune, deeming The Chronic superficial, unrefined entertainment, while writing that "Dre combines street potency with thuggish stupidity in equal measure." Village Voice critic Robert Christgau dismissed it as "sociopathic easy-listening" and "bad pop music" whose innovation—Dre's departure from sampling—is not inspired by contemporary P-Funk, but rather blaxploitation soundtracks, which led him to combine preset bass lines with imitations of "Bernie Worrell's high keyb sustain, a basically irritating sound that in context always signified fantasy, not reality—stoned self-loss or, at a best Dre never approaches, grandiose jive." He felt that the brutal lyrical threats were vague and lacked detail, but that Snoop Dogg rhymed "drolly" and less dully than Dre. Selects Adam Higginbotham opined that The Chronic was not as strong as releases from other gangster rap artists such as Ice Cube and Da Lench Mob and found it neither as "musically sharp, nor as lyrically smart as the latter". His review concluded that the album sounded like "all the pedestrian bits from The Predator", but that it was still better than anything Eazy-E had released.

In a retrospective piece, Jon Pareles from The New York Times said that The Chronic and Snoop Dogg's Doggystyle "made the gangsta life sound like a party occasionally interrupted by gunplay". AllMusic's Steve Huey compared Dr. Dre to his inspiration, George Clinton, stating "Dre's just as effortlessly funky, and he has a better feel for a hook, a knack that improbably landed gangsta rap on the pop charts". Rhapsody writer Brolin Winning named the album as "an untouchable masterpiece of California Gangsta Rap" and that it had "track after track of G-Funk gems". In Rolling Stones 500 Greatest Albums of All Time, it was noted that "Dre funked up the rhymes with a smooth bass-heavy production style and the laid-back delivery of then-unknown rapper Snoop Doggy Dogg." Time magazine's Josh Tyrangiel states that Dr. Dre created "a sound that defined early 90s urban L.A. in the same way that Motown defined 60s Detroit". Laura Sinagra, writing in The Rolling Stone Album Guide (2004), said that The Chronic "features system-busting Funkadelic beats designed to rumble your woofer while the matter-of-fact violence of the lyrics blows your smoke-filled mind".

 Accolades 

In 1994, "Nuthin' but a "G" Thang" and "Let Me Ride" were nominated at the 36th Grammy Awards, with the latter winning Best Rap Solo Performance for Dr. Dre. That year, readers of Hip Hop Connection voted it the fourth best album of all time, leading the magazine to speculate, "In a few years' time, it could even be remembered as the best rap album of all time."

The Chronic was included in Vibe magazine's list of the 100 Essential Albums of the 20th Century, and the magazine later included it in their list of the Top 10 Rap Albums of All Time, dubbing it a "decade-defining opus". The record was ranked eighth in Spin magazine's "90 Greatest Albums of the '90s", and in 2005, it was ranked at number thirty-five in their list of the "100 Greatest Albums, 1985–2005". Rolling Stone ranked The Chronic at number 138 on their list of the 500 Greatest Albums of All Time, and at 37 in their 2020 update. In 2005, MTV Networks listed The Chronic as the third greatest hip hop album in history. The following year, Time magazine named it as one of "The All-Time 100 Albums". In a retrospective issue, XXL magazine awarded The Chronic a perfect "XXL" rating. The Source, who originally gave the album a rating of 4.5 out of 5 mics in 1993, would later include it in their list of the 100 Best Rap Albums; in 2008, the magazine's former editor Reginald Dennis remarked that he "would have given it a five" in retrospect—the magazine's editors had a strict rule forbidding five-mic ratings at the time—and that "no one could have predicted the seismic shift that this album would produce". The Chronic is listed in the book 1001 Albums You Must Hear Before You Die.

 Commercial performance 
As of 2015, the album has sold 5.7 million copies in the United States, and was certified Triple Platinum by RIAA on November 3, 1993. It is Dr. Dre's second-bestselling album, as his follow-up album, 2001, was certified sextuple Platinum. The album first appeared on music charts in 1993, peaking on the Billboard 200 at number three, and peaking on Top R&B/Hip-Hop Albums at number one. The Chronic spent eight months in the Billboard Top 10. The album's three singles became top ten Billboard singles. "Nuthin' but a "G" Thang" peaked at number two on the Billboard Hot 100 and at number one on both the Hot Rap Singles and Hot R&B Singles charts. "Fuck Wit Dre Day (And Everybody's Celebratin')" became a top ten single on four different charts, including the Hot R&B Singles (number 6) and the Hot 100 (number 8).

The Chronic didn't chart on the UK Albums Chart until 2000. It re-entered the charts in 2003, peaking on the Ireland Albums Top 75 at number 48, and on the UK Albums Top 75 in 2004 at number 43. As of 2015, it has sold 260,814 copies there.

 Legacy 

Having split from N.W.A, Dr. Dre's first solo album established him as one of the biggest hip hop stars of his era. Yahoo! Music writer S.L. Duff wrote of the album's impact on his status in hip hop at the time, stating "Dre's considerable reputation is based on this release, alongside his production technique on Snoop's Doggystyle" and his early work with N.W.A. Whatever one thinks of the over-the-top bravado rapping, the tracks and beats Dre assembled are beyond reproach". The Chronic brought G-funk to the mainstream – a genre defined by slow bass beats and melodic synthesizers, topped by P-Funk samples, female vocals, and a laconic, laid-back lyrical delivery referred to as a "lazy drawl". The album takes its name from a slang term for premium grade cannabis, chronic. The album cover is an homage to Zig-Zag rolling papers. Robert Christgau said that, although he "can't stand" it, he respects The Chronic "for its influence and iconicity".

The album launched the careers of West Coast hip hop artists, including Snoop Doggy Dogg, Daz Dillinger, Kurupt, Nate Dogg, and Warren G, Dr. Dre's stepbrother – all of whom pursued successful commercial careers. The Chronic is widely regarded as the album that re-defined West Coast hip hop, demonstrated gangsta rap's commercial potential as a multi-platinum commodity, and established G-funk as the most popular sound in hip hop music for several years after its release, with Dr. Dre producing major albums that drew heavily on his production style. The album's success established Death Row Records as a dominant force in 1990s hip hop. It has been re-released 3 times, first as a remastered CD, then as a remastered DualDisc with enhanced stereo and four videos, and in 2009 as "The Chronic Re-Lit" with a bonus DVD containing a 30-minute interview and 7 unreleased tracks. On April 20, 2020, the album was distributed across all major streaming services, as it had previously been an Apple Music exclusive since 2015. 

However, on March 13, 2022, the album (along with several other Death Row albums) was removed from streaming services, with speculation that Snoop Dogg (who had acquired the label the previous month) wanted to turn the albums into NFTs. In January 2023, it was reported that as part of a deal with Universal Music Group and Shamrock Holdings for his music assets, the masters for the album were set to transfer from Death Row back to Dre in August of the same year, with the masters then being transferred to UMG as part of the deal. The following month, Dre announced that he has regained control of rights to the album (through his company Ary, Inc.) and restored the album to streaming services though the album's original distributor, Interscope Records.

 Track listing 
All songs produced by Dr. Dre.

 Personnel 
 Dr. Dre – vocals, synthesizers, producer, drum programming, mixing
 Snoop Doggy Dogg – vocals, co-writer
 Lady of Rage – vocals
 Warren G – vocals, drum programing, composer
 The D.O.C. – co-writer,  vocals
 RBX – vocals, composer
 Nate Dogg – vocals, composer
 Dat Nigga Daz – vocals, drum programming, composer
 Kurupt – vocals, composer  
 Jewell - vocals
 Colin Wolfe – bass guitar, bass keyboard, co-writer
 Justin Reinhardt – keyboards
 Katisse Buckingham – flute, saxophone
 Eric "The Drunk" Borders – guitar
 Chris Clairmont – guitar
 Bernie Grundman - mastering
 Greg "Gregski" Royal – mixing
 Chris "The Glove" Taylor – mixing
 Willie Will – mixing 
 Ben Butler – producer
 Jewell – executive producer

Charts

Weekly charts

Year-end charts

Certifications

See also
List of number-one R&B albums of 1993 (U.S.)

 References Works cited'''
 

 External links 
 The Chronic at Discogs
 Parents' Weekend with Dr. Dre: The Chronic at The Yale Herald The Chronic Stream''

1992 debut albums
Dr. Dre albums
Albums produced by Dr. Dre
Death Row Records albums
Interscope Records albums
Cannabis music
Priority Records albums
Albums produced by Suge Knight
United States National Recording Registry recordings
United States National Recording Registry albums
G-funk albums